The medieval Cistercian numerals, or "ciphers" in nineteenth-century parlance, were developed by the Cistercian monastic order in the early thirteenth century at about the time that Arabic numerals were introduced to northwestern Europe. They are more compact than Arabic or Roman numerals, with a single glyph able to indicate any integer from 1 to 9,999.

Digits are based on a horizontal or vertical stave, with the position of the digit on the stave indicating its place value (units, tens, hundreds or thousands). These digits are compounded on a single stave to indicate more complex numbers. The  Cistercians eventually abandoned the system in favor of the Arabic numerals, but marginal use outside the order continued until the early twentieth century.

History 
The digits and idea of forming them into ligatures were apparently based on a two-place (1–99) numeral system introduced into the Cistercian Order by John of Basingstoke, archdeacon of Leicester, who it seems based them on a twelfth-century English shorthand (ars notaria). In its earliest attestations, in the monasteries of the County of Hainaut, the Cistercian system was not used for numbers greater than 99, but it was soon expanded to four places, enabling numbers up to 9,999.

The two dozen or so surviving Cistercian manuscripts that use the system date from the thirteenth to the fifteenth century, and cover an area from England to Italy, Normandy to Sweden. The numbers were not used for arithmetic, fractions or accounting, but indicated years, foliation (numbering pages), divisions of texts, the numbering of notes and other lists, indexes and concordances, arguments in Easter tables, and the lines of a staff in musical notation. 

Although mostly confined to the Cistercian order, there was some usage outside it. A late-fifteenth-century Norman treatise on arithmetic used both Cistercian and Indo-Arabic numerals. In one known case, Cistercian numerals were inscribed on a physical object, indicating the calendrical, angular and other numbers on the fourteenth-century astrolabe of Berselius, which was made in French Picardy. 
After the Cistercians had abandoned the system, marginal use continued outside the order. In 1533, Heinrich Cornelius Agrippa von Nettesheim included a description of these ciphers in his Three Books of Occult Philosophy.
The numerals were used by wine-gaugers in the Bruges area at least until the early eighteenth century. 
In the late eighteenth century, Chevaliers de la Rose-Croix of Paris briefly adopted the numerals for mystical use, and in the early twentieth century Nazis considered using the numerals as Aryan symbolism.

The modern definitive expert on Cistercian numerals is the mathematician and historian of astronomy, David A. King.

Form 
A horizontal stave was most common while the numerals were in use among the Cistercians. A vertical stave was attested only in Northern France in the fourteenth and fifteenth centuries. However, eighteenth- and twentieth-century revivals of the system in France and Germany used a vertical stave. There is also some historical variation as to which corner of the number represented which place value. The place-values shown here were the most common among the Cistercians and the only ones used later.

Using graphic substitutes with a vertical stave, the first five digits are  1,  2,  3,  4,  5. Reversing them forms the tens,  10,  20,  30,  40,  50. Inverting them forms the hundreds,  100,  200,  300,  400,  500, and doing both forms the thousands,  1,000,  2,000,  3,000,  4,000,  5,000. Thus  (a digit 1 at each corner) is the number 1,111. (The exact forms varied by date and by monastery. For example, the digits shown here for 3 and 4 were in some manuscripts swapped with those for 7 and 8, and the 5's may be written with a lower dot ( etc.), with a short vertical stroke in place of the dot, or even with a triangle joining to the stave, which in other manuscripts indicated a 9.)

Horizontal numbers were the same, but rotated 90 degrees counter-clockwise.

Omitting a digit from a corner meant a value of zero for that power of ten, but there was no digit zero. (That is, an empty stave was not defined.)

Higher numbers 
When the system spread outside the order in the fifteenth and sixteenth centuries, numbers into the millions were enabled by compounding with the digit for "thousand". For example, a late-fifteenth century Norman treatise on arithmetic indicated 10,000 as a ligature of  "1,000" wrapped under and around  "10" (and similarly for higher numbers), and Noviomagus in 1539 wrote "million" by subscripting  "1,000" under another  "1,000". A late-thirteenth-century Cistercian doodle had differentiated horizontal digits for lower powers of ten from vertical digits for higher powers of ten, but that potentially productive convention is not known to have been exploited at the time; it could have covered numbers into the tens of millions (horizontal 100 to 103, vertical 104 to 107). A sixteenth-century mathematician used vertical digits for the traditional values, horizontal digits for millions, and rotated them a further 45° counter-clockwise for billions and another 90° for trillions, but it is not clear how the intermediate powers of ten were to be indicated and this convention was not adopted by others.

The Ciphers of the Monks
The Ciphers of the Monks: A Forgotten Number-notation of the Middle Ages, by David A. King and published in 2001, describes the Cistercian numeral system.

The book received mixed reviews. Historian Ann Moyer lauded King for re-introducing the numerical system to a larger audience, since many had forgotten about it. Mathematician Detlef Spalt claimed that King exaggerated the system's importance and made mistakes in applying the system in the book devoted to it. Moritz Wedell, however, called the book a "lucid description" and a "comprehensive review of the history of research" concerning the monks' ciphers.

Notes

References

External links 

FRB Cistercian font (OTF) at GitHub. Uses the Private Use Area, since Unicode has declined to assign character codes. Font characters are segments, to be combined into the complete numerals.
Cistercian number generator at dCode. Uses digit shapes similar to the astrolabe (vertical stave, triangular 5).
L2/20-290 Background for Unicode consideration of Cistercian numerals
Cistercian Web Component for use on web pages. Includes a live updating Cistercian numeral clock.

Numeral systems